Walnut Township is a township in Cowley County, Kansas, USA.  As of the 2000 census, its population was 626.

Geography
According to the USGS, it contains one cemetery, Cowley.

The streams of Black Crook Creek, Cedar Creek, East Badger Creek, Lone Elm Creek, Timber Creek and West Badger Creek run through this township.

References
 USGS Geographic Names Information System (GNIS)

External links
 City-Data.com

Townships in Cowley County, Kansas
Townships in Kansas